is a railway station in the city of Nikkō, Tochigi, Japan, operated by the private railway operator Tōbu Railway. The station is numbered "TN-52".

Lines

Station layout
The station consists of an island platform serving tracks, connected to the station building by a footbridge.

Platforms

Adjacent stations

History
Ōkuwa Station opened on 2 January 1917. It was destaffed from 1 September 1983.

From 17 March 2012, station numbering was introduced on all Tōbu lines, with Ōkuwa Station becoming "TN-52.

The platform received protection by the national government as a Registered Tangible Cultural Property in 2017.

Passenger statistics
In fiscal 2019, the station was used by an average of 177 passengers daily (boarding passengers only).

Surrounding area
 Ōkuwa Post Office

See also
 List of railway stations in Japan

References

External links

  

Railway stations in Tochigi Prefecture
Stations of Tobu Railway
Railway stations in Japan opened in 1917
Tobu Kinugawa Line
Nikkō, Tochigi
Registered Tangible Cultural Properties